Aurai Assembly constituency may refer to 
 Aurai, Bihar Assembly constituency
 Aurai, Uttar Pradesh Assembly constituency